Michael Rubens Bloomberg (born February 14, 1942) is an American businessman, politician, philanthropist, and author. He is the majority owner, co-founder and CEO of Bloomberg L.P. He was Mayor of New York City from 2002 to 2013, and was a candidate for the 2020 Democratic nomination for President of the United States. He has served as chair of the Defense Innovation Board, an independent advisory board that provides recommendations on artificial intelligence, software, data and digital modernization to the United States Department of Defense, since June 2022.

Bloomberg grew up in Medford, Massachusetts, and graduated from Johns Hopkins University and Harvard Business School. He began his career at the securities brokerage Salomon Brothers before forming his own company in 1981. That company, Bloomberg L.P., is a financial information, software and media firm that is known for its Bloomberg Terminal. Bloomberg spent the next twenty years as its chairman and CEO. As of June 2022, Forbes ranked him as the sixteenth-richest person in the world, with an estimated net worth of US$82 billion and ranked 14th in Forbes 400 with net worth $55 billion. Since signing The Giving Pledge, Bloomberg has given away $8.2 billion to philanthropic causes.

Bloomberg was elected the 108th mayor of New York City, and the city's third Jewish mayor. First elected in 2001, he held office for three consecutive terms, winning re-election in 2005 and 2009. Pursuing socially liberal and fiscally moderate policies, Bloomberg developed a technocratic managerial style.

As the mayor of New York, Bloomberg established public charter schools, rebuilt urban infrastructure, and supported gun control, public health initiatives, and environmental protections. He also led a rezoning of large areas of the city, which facilitated massive and widespread new commercial and residential construction after the September 11 attacks. Bloomberg is considered to have had far-reaching influence on the politics, business sector, and culture of New York City during his three terms as mayor. He has also faced significant criticism for his expansion of the city's stop and frisk program, support for which he reversed with an apology before his 2020 presidential run.

After a brief stint as a full-time philanthropist, he re-assumed the position of CEO at Bloomberg L.P. by the end of 2014. In November 2019, Bloomberg officially launched his campaign for the Democratic nomination for president of the United States in the 2020 election. He ended his campaign in March 2020, after having won only 61 delegates. Bloomberg self-funded $935 million for his candidacy, which set the record for the most expensive U.S. presidential primary campaign.

Early life and education 

Bloomberg was born on February 14, 1942, at St. Elizabeth's Hospital, in the Brighton neighborhood of Boston, to William Henry Bloomberg (1906–1963), a bookkeeper for a dairy company, and Charlotte (née Rubens) Bloomberg (1909–2011). The Bloomberg Center at the Harvard Business School was named in William Henry's honor. Bloomberg's family is Jewish, and he is a member of the Temple Emanu-El in Manhattan. Bloomberg's paternal grandfather, Rabbi Alexander "Elick" Bloomberg, was a Polish Jew. Bloomberg's maternal grandfather, Max Rubens, was a Lithuanian Jewish immigrant from present-day Belarus, and his maternal grandmother was born in New York to Lithuanian Jewish parents.

The family lived in Allston until Bloomberg was two years old, followed by Brookline, Massachusetts, for two years, finally settling in the Boston suburb of Medford, Massachusetts, where he lived until after he graduated from college.

Bloomberg became an Eagle Scout when he was twelve years old. He graduated from Medford High School in 1960. He went on to attend Johns Hopkins University, where he joined the fraternity Phi Kappa Psi. While there, he constructed the blue jay costume for the university's mascot. He graduated in 1964 with a Bachelor of Science degree in electrical engineering. In 1966, he graduated from Harvard Business School with a Master of Business Administration (MBA) degree.

Bloomberg is a member of Kappa Beta Phi and Tau Beta Pi. He wrote an autobiography, Bloomberg by Bloomberg, with help from Bloomberg News editor-in-chief Matthew Winkler.

Business career 

In 1973, Bloomberg became a general partner at Salomon Brothers, a large Wall Street investment bank, where he headed equity trading and, later, systems development. Phibro Corporation bought Salomon Brothers in 1981, and the new management fired Bloomberg, paying him $10 million for his equity in the firm.

Using this money, Bloomberg, having designed in-house computerized financial systems for Salomon, set up a data services company named Innovative Market Systems (IMS) based on his belief that Wall Street would pay a premium for high-quality business information, delivered instantaneously on computer terminals in a variety of usable formats. The company sold customized computer terminals that delivered real-time market data, financial calculations and other analytics to Wall Street firms. The terminal, first called the Market Master terminal, was released to market in December 1982.

In 1986, the company renamed itself Bloomberg L.P. Over the years, ancillary products including Bloomberg News, Bloomberg Radio, Bloomberg Message, and Bloomberg Tradebook were launched. Bloomberg, L.P. had revenues of approximately $10 billion in 2018. As of 2019, the company has more than 325,000 terminal subscribers worldwide and employs 20,000 people in dozens of locations.

The culture of the company in the 1980s and 1990s has been compared to a fraternity, with employees bragging in the company's office about their sexual exploits. The company was sued four times by female employees for sexual harassment, including one incident in which a victim claimed to have been raped. To celebrate Bloomberg's 48th birthday, colleagues published a pamphlet entitled Portable Bloomberg: The Wit and Wisdom of Michael Bloomberg. Among various sayings that were attributed to him, several have subsequently been criticized as sexist or misogynistic.

When he left the position of CEO to pursue a political career as the mayor of New York City, Bloomberg was replaced by Lex Fenwick and later by Daniel L. Doctoroff, after his initial service as deputy mayor under Bloomberg. After completing his final term as the mayor of New York City, Bloomberg spent his first eight months out of office as a full-time philanthropist. In fall 2014, he announced that he would return to Bloomberg L.P. as CEO at the end of 2014, succeeding Doctoroff, who had led the company since February 2008. Bloomberg resigned as CEO of Bloomberg L.P. to run for president in 2019.

Wealth 
In March 2009, Forbes reported Bloomberg's wealth at $16 billion, a gain of $4.5 billion over the previous year, the world's biggest increase in wealth from 2008 to 2009. Bloomberg moved from 142nd to 17th in the Forbes list of the world's billionaires in only two years. In the 2019 Forbes list of the world's billionaires, he was the ninth-richest person; his net worth was estimated at $55.5 billion. Currently, Bloomberg's net worth is estimated at $59 billion, ranking him 20th on Forbes''' list of billionaires.

 Political career 
 Mayor of New York City 

Bloomberg assumed office as the 108th mayor of New York City on January 1, 2002. He won re-election in 2005 and again in 2009. As mayor, he initially struggled with approval ratings as low as 24 percent; however, he subsequently developed and maintained high approval ratings. Bloomberg joined Rudy Giuliani, John Lindsay, and Fiorello La Guardia as re-elected Republican mayors in the mostly Democratic city.

Bloomberg stated that he wanted public education reform to be the legacy of his first term and addressing poverty to be the legacy of his second.

Bloomberg chose to apply a statistical, metrics-based management approach to city government, and granted departmental commissioners broad autonomy in their decision-making. Breaking with 190 years of tradition, he implemented what New York Times political reporter Adam Nagourney called a "bullpen" open office plan, similar to a Wall Street trading floor, in which dozens of aides and managerial staff are seated together in a large chamber. The design is intended to promote accountability and accessibility.

Bloomberg accepted a remuneration of $1 annually in lieu of the mayoral salary.

As mayor, Bloomberg turned the city's $6 billion budget deficit into a $3 billion surplus, largely by raising property taxes. Bloomberg increased city funding for the new development of affordable housing through a plan that created and preserved an estimated 160,000 affordable homes in the city. In 2003, he implemented a successful smoking ban in all indoor workplaces, including bars and restaurants, and many other cities and states followed suit. On December 5, 2006, New York City became the first city in the United States to ban trans-fat from all restaurants. This went into effect in July 2008 and has since been adopted in many other cities and countries. Bloomberg created bicycle lanes, required chain restaurants to post calorie counts, and pedestrianized much of Times Square. In 2011, Bloomberg launched the NYC Young Men's Initiative, a $127 million initiative to support programs and policies designed to address disparities between young Black and Latino men and their peers, and personally donated $30 million to the project. In 2010, Bloomberg supported the then-controversial Islamic complex near Ground Zero.

Under the Bloomberg Administration, the New York City Police Department greatly expanded its stop and frisk program, with a sixfold increase in documented stops. The policy was challenged in U.S. Federal Court, which ruled that the city's implementation of the policy violated citizens' rights under the Fourth Amendment of the Constitution and encouraged racial profiling. Bloomberg's administration appealed the ruling; however, his successor, Mayor Bill de Blasio, dropped the appeal and allowed the ruling to take effect. After the September 11 attacks, with assistance from the Central Intelligence Agency, Bloomberg's administration oversaw a controversial program that surveilled Muslim communities on the basis of their religion, ethnicity, and language. The program was discontinued in 2014.

In a January 2014 Quinnipiac poll, 64 percent of voters called Bloomberg's 12 years as mayor "mainly a success".

 Mayoral elections 
 2001 election 

In 2001, New York's Republican mayor Rudy Giuliani, was ineligible for re-election due to the city's limit of two consecutive terms. Bloomberg, who had been a lifelong member of the Democratic Party, decided to run for mayor on the Republican ticket. Voting in the primary began on the morning of September 11, 2001. The primary was postponed later that day, due to the September 11 attacks. In the rescheduled primary, Bloomberg defeated Herman Badillo, a former Democratic congressman, to become the Republican nominee. After a runoff, the Democratic nomination went to New York City Public Advocate Mark J. Green.

Bloomberg received Giuliani's endorsement to succeed him in the 2001 election. He also had a huge campaign spending advantage. Although New York City's campaign finance law restricts the amount of contributions that a candidate can accept, Bloomberg chose not to use public funds and therefore his campaign was not subject to these restrictions. He spent $73 million of his own money on his campaign, outspending Green five to one. One of the major themes of his campaign was that, with the city's economy suffering from the effects of the World Trade Center attacks, it needed a mayor with business experience.

In addition to running on the Republican line, Bloomberg ran on the ticket of the controversial Independence Party, in which "Social Therapy" leaders Fred Newman and Lenora Fulani exerted strong influence. Bloomberg's votes on that line exceeded his margin of victory over Green. (Under New York's fusion rules, a candidate can run on more than one party's line and combine all the votes received.) Another factor was the vote in Staten Island, which has traditionally been friendlier to Republicans than the rest of the city. Bloomberg received 75 percent of the vote in Staten Island. Overall, he won 50.3 percent to 47.9 percent.

In the wake of the September 11 attacks, Bloomberg's administration made a successful bid to host the 2004 Republican National Convention. The convention drew thousands of protesters, among them New Yorkers who despised George W. Bush and the Bush administration's pursuit of the Iraq War.

 2005 election 

Bloomberg was re-elected mayor in November 2005 by a margin of 20 percent, the widest margin ever for a Republican mayor of New York City. He spent almost $78 million on his campaign, exceeding the record of $74 million he spent on the previous election. In late 2004 or early 2005, Bloomberg gave the Independence Party of New York $250,000 to fund a phone bank seeking to recruit volunteers for his re-election campaign.

Former Bronx Borough President Fernando Ferrer won the Democratic nomination to oppose Bloomberg in the general election. Thomas Ognibene sought to run against Bloomberg in the Republican Party's primary election. The Bloomberg campaign successfully challenged the signatures Ognibene submitted to the Board of Elections to prevent Ognibene from appearing on ballots for the Republican primary. Instead, Ognibene ran on only the Conservative Party ticket. Ognibene accused Bloomberg of betraying Republican Party ideals, a feeling echoed by others.

Bloomberg opposed the confirmation of John Roberts as Chief Justice of the United States. Bloomberg is a staunch supporter of abortion rights and did not believe that Roberts was committed to maintaining Roe v. Wade. In addition to Republican support, Bloomberg obtained the endorsements of several prominent Democrats: former Democratic mayor Ed Koch; former Democratic governor Hugh Carey; former Democratic City Council Speaker Peter Vallone, and his son, Councilman Peter Vallone Jr.; former Democratic Congressman Floyd Flake (who had previously endorsed Bloomberg in 2001), and Brooklyn Borough President Marty Markowitz.

 2009 election 

On October 2, 2008, Bloomberg announced he would seek to extend the city's term limits law and run for a third mayoral term in 2009, arguing a leader of his field was needed following the financial crisis of 2007–08. "Handling this financial crisis while strengthening essential services ... is a challenge I want to take on," Bloomberg said at a news conference. "So should the City Council vote to amend term limits, I plan to ask New Yorkers to look at my record of independent leadership and then decide if I have earned another term."

Ronald Lauder, who campaigned for New York City's term limits in 1993 and spent over 4 million dollars of his own money to limit the maximum years a mayor could serve to eight years, sided with Bloomberg and agreed to stay out of future legality issues. In exchange, he was promised a seat on an influential city board by Bloomberg.

Some people and organizations objected and NYPIRG filed a complaint with the City Conflict of Interest Board. On October 23, 2008, the city council voted 29–22 in favor of extending the term limit to three consecutive four-year terms. After two days of public hearings, Bloomberg signed the bill into law on November 3.

Bloomberg's bid for a third term generated some controversy. Civil libertarians such as former New York Civil Liberties Union Director Norman Siegel and New York Civil Rights Coalition Executive Director Michael Meyers joined with local politicians to protest the process as undermining the democratic process.

Bloomberg's opponent was Democratic and Working Families Party nominee Bill Thompson, who had been New York City Comptroller for the past eight years and before that, president of the New York City Board of Education. Bloomberg defeated Thompson by a vote of 51 percent to 46 percent. Bloomberg spent $109.2 million on his 2009 campaign, outspending Thompson by a margin of more than 11 to one.

After the release of Independence Party campaign filings in January 2010, it was reported that Bloomberg had made two $600,000 contributions from his personal account to the Independence Party on October 30 and November 2, 2009. The Independence Party then paid $750,000 of that money to Republican Party political operative John Haggerty Jr.

This prompted an investigation beginning in February 2010 by the office of New York County District Attorney Cyrus Vance Jr. into possible improprieties. The Independence Party later questioned how Haggerty spent the money, which was to go to poll-watchers. Former New York State Senator Martin Connor contended that because the Bloomberg donations were made to an Independence Party housekeeping account rather than to an account meant for current campaigns, this was a violation of campaign finance laws. Haggerty also spent money from a separate $200,000 donation from Bloomberg on office space.

 2013 election 

On September 13, 2013, Bloomberg announced that he would not endorse any of the candidates to succeed him. On his radio show, he stated, "I don't want to do anything that complicates it for the next mayor. And that's one of the reasons I've decided I'm just not going to make an endorsement in the race." He added, "I want to make sure that person is ready to succeed, to take what we've done and build on that."

Bloomberg praised The New York Times for its endorsement of Christine Quinn and Joe Lhota as their favorite candidates in the Democratic and Republican primaries, respectively. Quinn came in third in the Democratic primary and Lhota won the Republican primary. Bloomberg criticized Democratic mayoral candidate Bill de Blasio's campaign methods, which he initially called "racist"; Bloomberg later downplayed and partially retracted those remarks.

On January 1, 2014, de Blasio became New York City's new mayor, succeeding Bloomberg.

 Post-mayoral political involvement 

Bloomberg was frequently mentioned as a possible centrist candidate for the presidential elections in 2008 and 2012, as well as for governor of New York in 2010 or vice-president in 2008. He eventually declined to seek all of these offices.

In the immediate aftermath of Hurricane Sandy in November 2012, Bloomberg penned an op-ed officially endorsing Barack Obama for president, citing Obama's policies on climate change.

 2016 elections 

On January 23, 2016, it was reported that Bloomberg was again considering a presidential run, as an independent candidate in the 2016 election, if Bernie Sanders got the Democratic party nomination. This was the first time he had officially confirmed he was considering a run. Bloomberg supporters believed that Bloomberg could run as a centrist and capture many voters who were dissatisfied with the likely Democratic and Republican nominees. However, on March 7, Bloomberg announced he would not be running for president.

In July 2016, Bloomberg delivered a speech at the 2016 Democratic National Convention in which he called Hillary Clinton "the right choice". Bloomberg warned of the dangers a Donald Trump presidency would pose. He said Trump "wants you to believe that we can solve our biggest problems by deporting Mexicans and shutting out Muslims. He wants you to believe that erecting trade barriers will bring back good jobs. He's wrong on both counts." Bloomberg also said Trump's economic plans "would make it harder for small businesses to compete" and would "erode our influence in the world". Trump responded to the speech by condemning Bloomberg in a series of tweets.

 2018 elections 
In June 2018, Bloomberg pledged $80 million to support Democratic congressional candidates in the 2018 election, with the goal of flipping control of the Republican-controlled House to Democrats. In a statement, Bloomberg said that Republican House leadership were "absolutely feckless" and had failed to govern responsibly. Bloomberg advisor Howard Wolfson was chosen to lead the effort, which was to target mainly suburban districts. By early October, Bloomberg had committed more than $100 million to returning the House and Senate to Democratic power, fueling speculation about a presidential run in 2020. On October 10, 2018, Bloomberg announced that he had returned to the Democratic party.

 2020 presidential campaign 

On March 5, 2019, Bloomberg had announced that he would not run for president in 2020. Instead, he encouraged the Democratic Party to "nominate a Democrat who will be in the strongest position to defeat Donald Trump". However, due to his dissatisfaction with the Democratic field, Bloomberg reconsidered. He officially launched his campaign for the 2020 Democratic nomination on November 24, 2019.

Bloomberg self-funded his campaign from his personal fortune, and did not accept campaign contributions.

Bloomberg's campaign suffered from his lackluster performance in two televised debates. When Bloomberg participated in his first presidential debate, Elizabeth Warren challenged him to release women from non-disclosure agreements relating to their allegations of sexual harassment at Bloomberg L.P. Two days later, Bloomberg announced that there were three women who had made complaints concerning him, and added that he would release any of the three if they request him to do so. Warren continued her attack in the second debate the next week. Others criticized Bloomberg for his wealth and campaign spending, as well as his former affiliation with the Republican Party.

As a late entrant to the race, Bloomberg skipped the first four state primaries and caucuses. He spent $676 million of his personal fortune on the primary campaign, breaking a record for the most money ever spent on a presidential primary campaign. His campaign blanketed the country with campaign advertisements on broadcast and cable television, the Internet, and radio, as well as direct mail. Bloomberg also spent heavily on campaign operations that grew to 200 field offices and more than 2,400 paid campaign staffers. His support in nationwide opinion polls hovered around 15 percent but stagnated or dropped before Super Tuesday, while former vice president Joe Biden had become the centrist frontrunner after receiving the support of major candidates Pete Buttigieg and Amy Klobuchar shortly before Super Tuesday. Bloomberg suspended his campaign on March 4, 2020, after a disappointing Super Tuesday in which he won only American Samoa, and subsequently endorsed Biden. Bloomberg donated $18 million to the Democratic National Committee and publicly planned a "massive spending blitz" to support Biden's campaign.

When a 60 Minutes correspondent remarked on March 1 that Bloomberg had spent twice what President Trump had raised, he was asked how much he would spend. Bloomberg replied, "I'm making an investment in this country. My investment is I'm going to remove President Trump from 1600 Pennsylvania Avenue or at least try as hard as I can."

Speaking on the final night of the 2020 Democratic National Convention, Bloomberg took aim at Trump's handling of the COVID-19 pandemic and the American economy: "Would you rehire or work for someone who ran your business into the ground? Who always does what's best for him or her, even when it hurts the company, and whose reckless decisions put you in danger, and who spends more time tweeting than working? If the answer is no, why the hell would we ever rehire Donald Trump for another four years?"

 Defense Innovation Board 
In February 2022, Bloomberg was nominated to chair the Defense Innovation Board, being sworn in on June 22, 2022.

 Political positions 

Bloomberg was a lifelong Democrat until 2001, when he switched to the Republican Party to run for mayor. He switched to an independent in 2007 and registered again as a Democrat in October 2018. In 2004, he endorsed the re-election of George W. Bush and spoke at the 2004 Republican National Convention. He endorsed Barack Obama's re-election in 2012, endorsed Hillary Clinton in the 2016 election, and spoke at the 2016 Democratic National Convention.

As Mayor of New York, Bloomberg supported government initiatives in public health and welfare. This included tobacco control efforts (including an increase in the legal age to purchase tobacco products, a ban on smoking in indoor workplaces, and an increase in the cigarette tax); the elimination of the use of artificial trans fats in restaurants; and bans on all flavored tobacco and e-cigarette products including menthol flavors. Bloomberg also launched an unsuccessful effort to ban on certain large (more than 16 fluid ounce) sugary sodas at restaurants and food service establishments in the city. These initiatives were supported by public health advocates but were criticized by some as "nanny state" policies.

Over his career, Bloomberg has "mingled support for progressive causes with more conservative positions on law enforcement, business regulation and school choice." Bloomberg supports gun-control measures, abortion rights, same-sex marriage, and a pathway to citizenship for illegal immigrants. He advocates for a public health insurance option that he has called "Medicare for all for people that are uncovered" rather than a universal single-payer healthcare system. He is concerned about climate change and has touted his mayoral efforts to reduce greenhouse gases. Bloomberg supported the Iraq War and opposed creating a timeline for withdrawing troops. Bloomberg has sometimes embraced the use of surveillance in efforts to deter crime and protect against terrorism.

During and after his tenure, he was a staunch supporter of stop-and-frisk. In November 2019, Bloomberg apologized for supporting it. He advocates reversing many of the Trump tax cuts. His own tax plan includes implementing a 5 percent surtax on incomes above $5 million a year and would raise federal revenue by $5 trillion over a decade. He opposes a wealth tax, saying that it would likely be found unconstitutional. He has also proposed more stringent financial regulations that include tougher oversight for big banks, a financial transactions tax, and stronger consumer protections. He supported decreasing estate-tax threshold to collect more estate taxes and close tax avoidance schemes. According to Propublica investigation he set up multiple GRATs thus shielding parts of his fortune for his heirs.

Bloomberg stated that running as a Democratnot an independentwas the only path he saw to defeating Donald Trump, saying: "In 2020, the great likelihood is that an independent would just split the anti-Trump vote and end up re-electing the President. That's a risk I refused to run in 2016 and we can't afford to run it now."

 Philanthropy 

In August 2010, Bloomberg signed The Giving Pledge, whereby the wealthy pledge to give away at least half of their wealth. Since then, he has given away $9.5 billion overall including $3.3 billion in 2019. According to Chronicle of Philanthropy, he gave away the most money of any philanthropist in 2019.

His Bloomberg Philanthropies foundation focuses on public health, the arts, government innovation, the environment, and education. Through the foundation, he donated or pledged $767 million in 2018, and more than $1 billion in 2019.

2011 recipients included the Campaign for Tobacco-Free Kids; Centers for Disease Control and Prevention; Johns Hopkins Bloomberg School of Public Health; World Lung Foundation and the World Health Organization. According to The New York Times, Bloomberg was an "anonymous donor" to the Carnegie Corporation from 2001 to 2010, with gifts ranging from $5 million to $20 million each year. The Carnegie Corporation distributed these contributions to hundreds of New York City organizations ranging from the Dance Theatre of Harlem to Gilda's Club, a non-profit organization that provides support to people and families living with cancer. He continues to support the arts through his foundation.

Bloomberg gave $254 million in 2009 to almost 1,400 nonprofit organizations, saying, "I am a big believer in giving it all away and have always said that the best financial planning ends with bouncing the check to the undertaker."

 COVID-19 response 
During the 2020 COVID-19 pandemic and its aftermath, Bloomberg through his foundation committed to a wide range of urgent causes including researching treatments and vaccines, leading contact tracing to root out the virus, supporting the World Health Organization, and funding global efforts to fight the spread of the disease and protect vulnerable populations. Action included:

 Cofounding a $75 million fund for nonprofits impacted by COVID-19 in New York City
 Donating $6 million to World Central Kitchen to serve meals to health care workers in New York City
 Partnering with Johns Hopkins University to train COVID-19 contact tracers through its school of public health and search for a treatment of the virus.
 Convening mayors through a partnership with Harvard College to learn and discuss their pandemic response, featuring a bipartisan roster of speakers and attendees.
 Leading New York's contact tracing effort
 Launching an information and action sharing network for cities through the National League of Cities
 Supporting international efforts to combat the spread of COVID-19 and prepare regional leaders through the International Rescue Committee, the World Health Organization, Vital Strategies and other partners

 Environmental advocacy 
Bloomberg is an environmentalist and has advocated policy to fight climate change at least since he became the mayor of New York City. At the national level, Bloomberg has consistently pushed for transitioning the United States' energy mix from fossil fuels to clean energy. In July 2011, Bloomberg Philanthropies donated $50 million to Sierra Club's Beyond Coal campaign, allowing the campaign to expand its efforts to shut down coal-fired power plants from 15 states to 45 states. In 2015, Bloomberg announced an additional $30 million contribution to the Beyond Coal initiative, matched with another $30 million by other donors, to help secure the retirement of half of America's fleet of coal plants by 2017. In July 2017, Europe Beyond Coal was established to phase out use of coal on the continent by 2030. Austria closed its final coal-fired plant in April 2020. In early June 2019, Bloomberg pledged $500 million to reduce climate impacts and shut remaining coal-fired power plants by 2030 via the new Beyond Carbon initiative.

Bloomberg Philanthropies awarded a $6 million grant to the Environmental Defense Fund in support of strict regulations on fracking in the 14 states with the heaviest natural gas production.

In 2013, Bloomberg and Bloomberg Philanthropies launched the Risky Business initiative with former Treasury Secretary Hank Paulson and hedge-fund billionaire Tom Steyer. The joint effort worked to convince the business community of the need for more sustainable energy and development policies, by quantifying and publicizing the economic risks the United States faces from the impact of climate change. In January 2015, Bloomberg led Bloomberg Philanthropies in a $48-million partnership with the Heising-Simons family to launch the Clean Energy Initiative. The initiative supports state-based solutions aimed at ensuring America has a clean, reliable, and affordable energy system.

Since 2010, Bloomberg has taken an increasingly global role on environmental issues. From 2010 to 2013, he served as the chairman of the C40 Cities Climate Leadership Group, a network of the world's biggest cities working together to reduce carbon emissions. During his tenure, Bloomberg worked with President Bill Clinton to merge C40 with the Clinton Climate Initiative, with the goal of amplifying their efforts in the global fight against climate change worldwide. He serves as the president of the board of C40 Cities. In January 2014, Bloomberg began a five-year commitment totaling $53 million through Bloomberg Philanthropies to the Vibrant Oceans Initiative. The initiative partners Bloomberg Philanthropies with Oceana, Rare, and Encourage Capital to help reform fisheries and increase sustainable populations worldwide. In 2018, Bloomberg joined Ray Dalio in announcing a commitment of $185 million towards protecting the oceans.

In 2014, United Nations Secretary General Ban Ki-moon appointed Bloomberg as his first Special Envoy for Cities and Climate Change to help the United Nations work with cities to prevent climate change. In September 2014, Bloomberg convened with Ban and global leaders at the UN Climate Summit to announce definite action to fight climate change in 2015. In 2018, Ban's successor António Guterres appointed Bloomberg as UN envoy for climate action. He resigned in November 2019, in the run-up to his presidential campaign. On 5 February 2021, however, he was re-appointed by Guterres as his Special Envoy on Climate Ambition and Solutions in the lead-up to the climate conference in Scotland scheduled for November 2021.

In late 2014, Bloomberg, Ban Ki-moon, and global city networks ICLEI-Local Governments for Sustainability (ICLEI), C40 Cities Climate Leadership Group (C40) and United Cities and Local Governments (UCLG), with support from UN-Habitat, launched the Compact of Mayors, a global coalition of mayors and city officials pledging to reduce local greenhouse gas emissions, enhance climate resilience, and track their progress transparently. To date, over 250 cities representing more than 300 million people worldwide and 4.1 percent of the total global population, have committed to the Compact of Mayors, which was merged with the Covenant of Mayors in June 2016.

In 2015, Bloomberg and Paris mayor Anne Hidalgo created the Climate Summit for Local Leaders. which convened assembled hundreds of city leaders from around the world at Paris City Hall to discuss fighting climate change. The Summit concluded with the presentation of the Paris Declaration, a pledge by leaders from assembled global cities to cut carbon emissions by 3.7 gigatons annually by 2030.

During the 2015 UN Climate Change Conference in Paris, Mark Carney, Governor of the Bank of England and chair of the Financial Stability Board, announced that Bloomberg would lead a new global task force designed to help industry and financial markets understand the growing risks of climate change.

Following President Donald Trump's announcement that the U.S. government would withdraw from the Paris climate accord, Bloomberg outlined a coalition of cities, states, universities and businesses that had come together to honor America's commitment under the agreement through 'America's Pledge'. Bloomberg offered up to $15 million to the UNFCCC, the UN body that assists countries with climate change efforts. About a month later, Bloomberg and California Governor Jerry Brown announced that the America's Pledge coalition would work to "quantify the actions taken by U.S. states, cities and business to drive down greenhouse gas emissions consistent with the goals of the Paris Agreement." In announcing the initiative, Bloomberg said "the American government may have pulled out of the Paris agreement, but American society remains committed to it." Two think tanks, World Resource Institute and the Rocky Mountain Institute, will work with America's Pledge to analyze the work cities, states and businesses do to meet the U.S. commitment to the Paris agreement.

In May 2019, Bloomberg announced a 2020 Midwestern Collegiate Climate Summit in Washington University in St. Louis with the aim to bring together leaders from Midwestern universities, local government and the private sector to reduce climate impacts in the region.

 Johns Hopkins University philanthropy 
As of 2019, Bloomberg has given more than $3.3 billion to Johns Hopkins University, his alma mater, making him "the most generous living donor to any education institution in the United States." His first contribution, in 1965, had been $5. He made his first $1 million commitment to JHU in 1984, and subsequently became the first individual to exceed $1 billion in lifetime donations to a single U.S. institution of higher education.

Bloomberg's contributions to Johns Hopkins "fueled major improvements in the university's reputation and rankings, its competitiveness for faculty and students, and the appearance of its campus," and included construction of a children's hospital (the Charlotte R. Bloomberg Children's Center Building, named after Bloomberg's mother); a physics building, a school of public health (the Johns Hopkins Bloomberg School of Public Health), libraries, and biomedical research facilities, including the Institute for Cell Engineering, a stem-cell research institute within the School of Medicine, and the Malaria Research Institute within the School of Public Health. In 2013, Bloomberg committed $350 million to Johns Hopkins, five-sevenths of which were allocated to the Bloomberg Distinguished Professorships. In 2016, Bloomberg Philanthropies contributed $300 million to establish the Bloomberg American Health Initiative. Bloomberg also funded the launch of the Bloomberg–Kimmel Institute for Cancer Immunotherapy within the Johns Hopkins School of Medicine in East Baltimore, with a $50 million gift; an additional $50 million was given by philanthropist Sidney Kimmel, and $25 million by other donors. It will support cancer therapy research, technology and infrastructure development, and private sector partnerships. In 2016, Bloomberg joined Vice President Joe Biden for the institute's formal launch, embracing Biden's "Cancer Moonshot" initiative, which seeks to find a cure for cancer through national coordination of government and private sector resources. In 2018, Bloomberg contributed a further gift of $1.8 billion to Johns Hopkins, allowing the university to practice need-blind admission and meet the full financial need of admitted students.

 Other educational and research philanthropy 
Through Bloomberg Philanthropies, Bloomberg established the American Talent Initiative in 2016 which is committed to increasing the number of lower-income high-achieving students attending elite colleges. Bloomberg Philanthropies also supports CollegePoint which has provided advising to lower- and moderate-income high school students since 2014.

In 2016, the Museum of Science, Boston announced a $50 million gift from Bloomberg. Bloomberg credited the museum with sparking his intellectual curiosity as a patron and student during his youth in Medford, Massachusetts. It is the largest donation in the museum's 186-year history.

In 2015, Bloomberg donated $100 million to Cornell Tech, the applied sciences graduate school of Cornell University on the school's Roosevelt Island campus.

In 1996, Bloomberg endowed the William Henry Bloomberg Professorship at Harvard University with a $3 million gift in honor of his father, who died in 1963, saying, "throughout his life, he recognized the importance of reaching out to the nonprofit sector to help better the welfare of the entire community."

 Urban innovation philanthropy 
In July 2011, Bloomberg launched a $24 million initiative to fund "Innovation Delivery Teams" in five cities. The teams are one of Bloomberg Philanthropies' key goals: advancing government innovation. In December 2011, Bloomberg Philanthropies launched a partnership with online ticket search engine SeatGeek to connect artists with new audiences. Called the Discover New York Arts Project, the project includes organizations HERE, New York Theatre Workshop, and the Kaufman Center.

In 2013, Bloomberg announced the Mayors Challenge competition to drive innovation in American cities. The program was later expanded to competitions in Latin America and Europe.

In 2016, Bloomberg gave Harvard $32 million to create the Bloomberg Harvard City Leadership Initiative within Harvard Kennedy School's Ash Center for Democratic Governance and Innovation; the initiative provides training to mayors and their aides on innovative municipal leadership and challenges facing cities.

In March 2021, Bloomberg gave Harvard $150 million to create the Bloomberg Center for Cities to support mayors.

 Tobacco, guns and public health 

Bloomberg has been a longtime donor to global tobacco control efforts. Bloomberg has donated close to $1 billion to the World Health Organization (WHO) to promote anti-smoking efforts, including $125 million in 2006, $250 million in 2008, and $360 million, making Bloomberg Philanthropies the developing world's biggest funder of tobacco-control initiatives. In 2013, it was reported that Bloomberg had donated $109.24 million in 556 grants and 61 countries to campaigns against tobacco. Bloomberg's contributions are aimed at "getting countries to monitor tobacco use, introduce strong tobacco-control laws, and create mass media campaigns to educate the public about the dangers of tobacco use." Bloomberg Philanthropies and the Campaign for Tobacco-Free Kids jointly launched a $160 million, three-year campaign against youth use of electronic cigarettes (vaping).

In Bloomberg is the co-founder of Everytown for Gun Safety (formerly Mayors Against Illegal Guns), a gun control advocacy group.

In 2016, the World Health Organization appointed Bloomberg as its Global Ambassador for Noncommunicable Diseases.

 Other philanthropy 
Through Bloomberg Philanthropies, Bloomberg supported the Fresh Air Fund's creation of 'Open Spaces in the City' in summer 2020 to provide socially-distant areas for kids to play during the COVID-19 pandemic, as well as jobs for local teens. He donated $3 million to the construction of a new public library in his hometown of Medford and $75 million for The Shed, a new arts and cultural center in Hudson Yards, Manhattan.

Bloomberg also endowed his hometown synagogue, Temple Shalom, which was renamed for his parents as the William and Charlotte Bloomberg Jewish Community Center of Medford.

Bloomberg hosted the Global Business Forum in 2017, during the annual meeting of the United Nations General Assembly; the gathering featured international CEOs, heads of state, and other prominent speakers.

In 2009 Bloomberg met with other billionaires such as Warren Buffett, Bill Gates, Ted Turner and Oprah Winfrey to address issues ranging from the environment, health care and concerns over population growth. Although no formal organization was established, the effort was understood to be designed to help bring various philanthropic projects of the mega-donors into a more unified effort to address various problems on our planet.

 Electoral history 

 Personal life 
 Family and relationships 
In 1975, Bloomberg married Susan Elizabeth Barbara Brown, a British national from Yorkshire, United Kingdom. They have two daughters: Emma (born c. 1979) and Georgina (born 1983), who were featured on Born Rich, a 2003 documentary film about the children of the extremely wealthy. Bloomberg divorced Brown in 1993, but he has said she remains his "best friend". Since 2000, Bloomberg has lived with former New York state banking superintendent Diana Taylor.

Bloomberg's younger sister, Marjorie Tiven, has been commissioner of the New York City Commission for the United Nations, Consular Corps and Protocol, since February 2002.

 Religion 
Although he attended Hebrew school, had a bar mitzvah, and his family kept a kosher kitchen, Bloomberg today is relatively secular, attending synagogue mainly during the High Holidays and a Passover Seder with his sister, Marjorie Tiven. Neither of his daughters had bat mitzvahs.

 Public image and lifestyle 
Throughout his business career, Bloomberg has made numerous statements which have been considered by some to be insulting, derogatory, sexist or misogynistic. When working on Wall Street in the 1960s and 1970s, Bloomberg claimed in his 1997 autobiography, he had "a girlfriend in every city". On various occasions, Bloomberg allegedly commented "I'd do her", regarding certain women, some of whom were coworkers or employees. Bloomberg later said that by "do", he meant that he would have a personal relationship with the woman. Bloomberg's staff told the New York Times that he now regrets having made "disrespectful" remarks concerning women.

During his term as mayor, he lived at his own home on the Upper East Side of Manhattan instead of Gracie Mansion, the official mayoral residence. In 2013, he owned 13 properties in various countries around the world, including a $20 million Georgian mansion in Southampton, New York. In 2015, he acquired 4 Cheyne Walk, a historical property in Cheyne Walk, Chelsea, London, which once belonged to writer George Eliot. Bloomberg and his daughters own houses in Bermuda and stay there frequently.

Bloomberg stated that during his mayoralty, he rode the New York City Subway on a daily basis, particularly in the commute from his 79th Street home to his office at City Hall. An August 2007 story in The New York Times stated that he was often seen chauffeured by two New York Police Department-owned SUVs to an express train station to avoid having to change from the local to the express trains on the IRT Lexington Avenue Line. He supported the construction of the 7 Subway Extension and the Second Avenue Subway; in December 2013, Bloomberg took a ceremonial ride on a train to the new 34th Street station to celebrate a part of his legacy as mayor.

During his tenure as mayor, Bloomberg made cameos playing himself in the films The Adjustment Bureau and New Year's Eve, as well as in episodes of 30 Rock, Curb Your Enthusiasm, The Good Wife, and two episodes of Law & Order.

Bloomberg is a private pilot. He owns six airplanes: three Dassault Falcon 900s, a Beechcraft B300, a Pilatus PC-24, and a Cessna 182 Skylane. Bloomberg also owns two helicopters: an AW109 and an Airbus helicopter and as of 2012 was near the top of the waiting list for an AW609 tiltrotor aircraft. In his youth he was a licensed amateur radio operator, was proficient in Morse code, and built ham radios.

 Awards and honors 
Bloomberg has received honorary degrees from Tufts University (2007), Bard College (2007), Rockefeller University (2007), the University of Pennsylvania (2008), Fordham University (2009), Williams College (2014), Harvard University (2014), the University of Michigan (2016), Villanova University (2017)  and Washington University in St. Louis (2019). Bloomberg was the speaker for Princeton University's 2011 baccalaureate service.

On May 27, 2010, Bloomberg delivered the commencement speech at his alma mater, Johns Hopkins University. In addition, he was invited to and delivered guest remarks for the Johns Hopkins Class of 2020. Other notable guest speakers during the virtual ceremony included Reddit co-founder and Commencement speaker Alexis Ohanian; Anthony Fauci, director of the National Institute of Allergy and Infectious Diseases and a leading member of the White House Coronavirus Task Force; and senior class president Pavan Patel

Bloomberg has received the Yale School of Management's Award for Distinguished Leadership in Global Capital Markets (2003); Golden Plate Award of the American Academy of Achievement presented by Ehud Barak (2004); Barnard College's Barnard Medal of Distinction (2008); the Robert Wood Johnson Foundation Leadership for Healthy Communities' Healthy Communities Leadership Award (2009); and the Jefferson Awards Foundation's U.S. Senator John Heinz Award for Greatest Public Service by an Elected or Appointed Official (2010). He was the inaugural laureate of the annual Genesis Prize for Jewish values in 2013, and donated the $1 million prize money to a global competition, the Genesis Generation Challenge, to identify young adults' big ideas to better the world.

Bloomberg was named the 39th most influential person in the world in the 2007 and 2008 Time 100. In 2010, Vanity Fair ranked him #7 in its "Vanity Fair 100" list of influential figures.

In 2014, Queen Elizabeth II appointed Bloomberg an Honorary Knight Commander of the Order of the British Empire for his "prodigious entrepreneurial and philanthropic endeavors, and the many ways in which they have benefited the United Kingdom and the U.K.-U.S. special relationship."

 Books and other works 
Bloomberg, with Matthew Winkler, wrote an autobiography, Bloomberg by Bloomberg, published in 1997 by Wiley. A second edition was released in 2019, ahead of Bloomberg's presidential run.Aaron Timms, Michael Bloomberg Earned $48 Billion and Eternal Adoration From Wall Street. But Does Anyone Else Want Him to Be President?, Institutional Investor (February 1, 2019). Bloomberg and former Sierra Club Executive Director Carl Pope co-authored Climate of Hope: How Cities, Businesses, and Citizens Can Save the Planet (2017), published by St. Martin's Press; the book appeared on the New York Times hardcover nonfiction best-seller list. Bloomberg has written a number of op-eds in The New York Times'' about various issues, including an op-ed supporting state and local efforts to fight climate change (2017), an op-ed about his donation of $1.8 billion in financial aid for college students and support for need-blind admission policies (2018); an op-ed supporting a ban on flavored e-cigarettes (2019); and an op-ed supporting policies to reduce economic inequality (2020).

See also 

 List of Harvard University people
 List of Johns Hopkins University people
 List of people from Boston
 List of philanthropists
 List of richest American politicians
 Timeline of New York City, 2000s–2010s

References

Further reading 
  Uses anthropology and geography to examine the mayor's corporate-style governance, with particular attention to the Hudson Yards plan, which aims to transform the far West Side into a high-end district.

External links 

 Mike Bloomberg official website
 Mike Blomberg biography at Bloomberg Philanthropies
 Issue positions and quotes at On the Issues
 Office of the Mayor of New York City (Archived November 23, 2013)
 
 
 

|-

|-

|-

|-

 
1942 births
20th-century American businesspeople
20th-century American essayists
20th-century American male writers
20th-century American politicians
21st-century American businesspeople
21st-century American essayists
21st-century American male writers
21st-century American politicians
21st-century philanthropists
Amateur radio people
American Reform Jews
American aviators
American billionaires
American chief executives in the media industry
American chief executives of financial services companies
American financial businesspeople
American financial company founders
American gun control activists
American health activists
American male non-fiction writers
American mass media owners
American memoirists
American people of Belarusian-Jewish descent
American people of Russian-Jewish descent
American political writers
American technology chief executives
American technology company founders
Anti-obesity activists
.
Businesspeople from Massachusetts
Businesspeople from New York City
Businesspeople in software
Candidates in the 2020 United States presidential election
Commercial aviators
Giving Pledgers
Harvard Business School alumni
Honorary Knights Commander of the Order of the British Empire
Jewish American philanthropists
Jewish American writers
Jewish mayors of places in the United States
Johns Hopkins Bloomberg School of Public Health
Johns Hopkins University alumni
Living people
Massachusetts Democrats
Massachusetts Republicans
Mayors of New York City
New York (state) Democrats
New York (state) Independents
New York (state) Republicans
People from the Upper East Side
Philanthropists from New York (state)
Writers from Boston
Writers from Manhattan
Members of the American Philosophical Society
Jewish American people in New York (state) politics
Jewish American candidates for President of the United States
Anti-smoking activists
Special Envoys of the Secretary-General of the United Nations